K-otic (เค-โอติค) was a Thai pop boy band consisting of five members, two of whom are Thai Japanese and one who is Korean. The band debuted with the single, "Ya Wai Chai" in March 2007, releasing the premier album later in October.

The group disbanded in 2012 due to Jongbae's mandatory military service and Poppy's architectural studies. Their final song, Friends, was released to commemorate their five years together.

In 2022, members Tomo, Koen, and Poppy re-debuted as the trio, TKP.

Members

Discography

Compilations

 Kamikaze:Khat Chai (2007)
 Kamikaze:Forward To You (Feb 2008)
 Kamikaze:Friendship Never Ends (Nov 2008)
 Kamikaze:Kamikaze Wave (2010)
 Kamikaze Lover Project (2011)

Studio albums

Special Music
Freestyle (2008)

Special projects
2 High 
 Dejavu January 28, (2010) in the album free to play
Monkey Hero 
 Unbelievable Feat.Girly Berry October 26, (2009) first released in kotic.myzheza.com and January 28, (2010) in the album free to play

Concerts
Kamikaze - Live Concert (2009)
Kamikaze Wave Concert  (2010)
Kamikaze Lover Concert (2011)
Kamikaze The 5th Destiny Concert (2012)
Kamikaze K Fight Concert (2013)

Movies & TV
 Scared (Kenta) (2005)
 Gig Number Two (Kenta) (2007)
 Bangkok Kungfu (Tomo) (2011)
 ฟ้ามีตา (Koen) (2014)
 The Iron Ladies 3 (Koen) (2014)
 Pokémon movie (Koen)

TV Programme
Kamikaze Club (2009; Poppy, Koen, Tomo)
K-OTIC Real (2011; Poppy, Koen, Tomo, Kenta, Jongbae) 
KAMIKAZE (2013; Koen, Tomo, Kenta)
เพลงใครเอ่ย (2014; Koen, Poppy Rookie BB)

Awards
 2008: Seventeen Magazine's Choice Rising Star as a Group
 2009: KAZZ Magazine Award - Best Group
 2009: POP Music Award - Best Idol
 2009: POP Music Award - Song of the Year
 2009: POP Music Award - POP Download - KAMIKAZE - Puean Gun Chun Ruk Tur
 2011: SEED Awards - Best MV 'Alone'

References

External links

 K-OTIC Official Site
 K-OTIC&KAMIKAZE Official Site

Thai pop music groups
Thai boy bands
Vocal quintets
Musical groups from Bangkok